József Gerlach (28 October 1938 – 18 August 2021) was a Hungarian diver. He competed in two events at the 1956 Summer Olympics.

Gerlach died in Ontario, California on 18 August 2021, at the age of 82.

References

External links
 

1938 births
2021 deaths
Hungarian male divers
Olympic divers of Hungary
Divers at the 1956 Summer Olympics
Divers from Budapest
Sportspeople from Budapest